The Playlist is a docu-drama miniseries created for Netflix. It was inspired by the book Spotify Untold written by Sven Carlsson and Jonas Leijonhufvud. Directed by Per-Olav Sørensen, the series tells a "fictionalized" story of the birth of the Swedish music streaming company, Spotify along with its early challenges.

The Playlist premiered on Netflix on 13 October 2022.

Premise 
An aspiring entrepreneur, Daniel Ek, finds an opportunity among the battle between music industries' heavy-hitters and music piracy. Ek sees a solution, never seen  before in a turbulent music industry. He then decides to build a free and legalized music streaming service along with his business partner, Martin Lorentzon. Little did he know, that service would "revolutionize" global music industry and face unforeseen challenges along with its foundations.

Cast and characters

Starring 

 Edvin Endre as Daniel Ek, co-founder and CEO of Spotify who previously worked as a software engineer for Tradera.
 Christian Hillborg as Martin Lorentzon, co-founder and primary investor of Spotify, owner & Co-founder of Tradedoubler.
 Joel Lützow as Andreas Ehn, a gifted programmer, Spotify's first employee and CTO is who Ek recruits to build the Spotify application.
 Gizem Erdogan as Petra Hansson, top-performing lawyer who was offered a position as a music licensing negotiator in Spotify. 
 Ulf Stenberg as Per Sundin, one of the executives of Sony Music Sweden who had struggled with the advent of The Pirate Bay.
 Janice Kamya Kavander as Bobbi Thomasson, an aspiring musician who is a former classmate of Daniel Ek.

Recurring co-stars 

 Valter Skarsgård as Peter Sunde, one of the founders of The Pirate Bay and a political activist.
 Krister Kern as Felix Hagnö, co-founder of Tradedoubler.
 Sofia Karemyr as Stephanie Dahlgren, secretary of Per Sundin who Daniel encounters.
 Severija Janušauskaitė as Maxine Silverson, Sony Music executive who is acquainted with Per Sundin.
 Sam Hazeldine as Ken Parks, formidable lawyer who works for Sony Music.
 Ella Rappich as Sophia Bendz, head of global marketing of Spotify who previously organized party events through Facebook.
 Erik Norén as Niklas Ivarsson, the only person who initially in charge of music acquisition of Spotify.
 Rufus Glaser as Ludvig Strigeus, one of the programmers of Spotify who had experience with P2P caching.
 Jonatan Bökman as Gunnar Kreitz, Andreas' friend from college who Andreas considers to be the best programmer in the world.
 Karl Sanner as Fredrik Niemela, Andreas' friend who Andreas considers to be able to rival Gunnar.
 Lucas Serby as Mattias Arrelid, Andreas' acquaintance who he recruits to build Spotify's program. 
 Alexander Gustavsson as Andreas Mattsson, Andreas' acquaintance who he recruits to build Spotify's program. 
 Vincent Pellegini as Rasmus Andersson, Andreas' acquaintance user interface designer of the first version of Spotify.
 Joel Almroth as Johann Brenner, Andreas' acquaintance who he recruits to build Spotify's program.
 Felice Jankell as Sofia Levander, Daniel Ek's wife.
 Frida K Eriksson as Daniel's mother.

Guest stars 
 Benjamin Löfquist as Fredrik Neij, co-founder of The Pirate Bay and a fellow political activist.
 Thore Biselli as Gottfrid Svartholm, co-founder of The Pirate Bay.
 Orlando Wells as Peter Thiel, venture capitalist who invests in Spotify.
 Samuel Fröler as Henrik Pontén, chief investigator of Swedish police who handles The Pirate Bay raid.
 Lisette Pagler as Karin Sundin, Per's wife who is also a mother of Billy Sundin.
 David Bredh as William Sundin, Per's son who is indifferent towards music piracy.
 Hanna Ardéhn as Lisa, medical student who works part-time in a bar Andreas regularly visits.
 Malin Barr as Aven, Petra's colleague who works at Smith-Ardehn Law Firm.
 Christoffer Willén as Carl, Petra's superior of Smith-Ardehn Law Firm.
 Dan Lilja as Mattias Mischke, the chief executive officer of Stardoll's game development company.
 Christel Elsayah as Felicia, radio host of Summer Talk Show who interviews Martin.
 Paul Albertson as Stanley Barret, representative of a popular artist, Taylor Swift.
 John Carew as Anton, one of the early investors of Spotify from Arctic Equity Partners.
 Sandra Redlaff as Esther Ren, one of the early investors of Spotify from Serendipity Capitals.
 Fredrik Wagner as Mats Lundholm, Greta's husband who is a lawyer.
 Janna Granström as Greta Lundholm, Karin's friend who becomes acquainted with Sundin family.
 Agnes Kittelsen as Ann Almquist, one of Spotify's executives who previously worked in politics.
 Patrick Baladi as Jim Anderson, one of Spotify's executives who tests its upcoming features of the service.
 Amy Deasismont as Nadya Johanssen, former musician who is a protester.
 Tim Ahern as Senator Grayson West, One of the U.S. senators present during Spotify's accusation hearing.
 Dionne Audain as Senator Madison Landy, One of the U.S. senators who issues Spotify's accusation hearing.
 Reuben Sallmander as Tom Holgersson

Episodes

Production

Development 
On 11 December 2019, Netflix announced a yet to be named limited series about the founding of music streaming company, Spotify. The series was inspired by a non-fiction book, Spotify Untold, written by Sven Carlsson and Jonas Leijonhufvud, business reporters at Swedish Dagens Industri. Berna Levin of Yellow Bird UK would serve as the executive producer of the series and Per-Olav Sørensen will direct the series. On 14 June 2021, further announcements are made, revealing that the series will consists of six 45-minute episode. In addition, Eiffel Mattsson and Luke Franklin would be producing along with Levin; meanwhile, Christian Spurrier was hired as the screenwriter for the series. On 13 September 2022, Sofie Forsman and Tove Forsman were revealed as series co-writers.

Casting 

Casting for the series leads were revealed on 14 June 2021. Edvin Endre and Christian Hillborg were cast as the co-founders of Spotify. Ulf Stenberg, Gizem Erdogan, and Joel Lützow also took leading roles.

Filming 
The filming of the series reportedly already began since 2021. It was revealed that the part of the principal photography took place in Stockholm, Sweden in June 2021. The post-production process happened in November 2021. As of August 2022, the production had already wrapped filming.

Release 
The Playlist premiered globally on Netflix on 13 October 2022, and consists of six episodes.

Marketing 
First trailer of the limited series was released on YouTube on 13 September 2022. The second trailer was released on 27 September 2022.

Reception 
The Playlist overall received positive reviews from critics.  Tom Goodwyn of TechRadar gave the series 5/5 stars, praising its writing, directing, and cast performances, with the story being told from six different perspective noted as its biggest strengths. Joel Keller of Decider similarly gave the series praise on its cast performances, particularly on Janice Kamya Kavander's acting, while noting the repetitiveness of its storytelling. Stuart Heritage of The Guardian gave the series 3/5 stars, also praised the multiple perspective of the storytelling while finding some episodes "a frustratingly bitty watch". Conversely, Mike McCahill of Variety criticized the series for its lack of "anything like the electric thrill of the Fincher film".

References

External links
 
 

2022 British television series debuts
2022 British television series endings
2022 Swedish television series debuts
2022 Swedish television series endings
2020s British workplace drama television series
2020s Swedish television series
Biographical television series
British drama television series
Swedish drama television series
English-language Netflix original programming
Swedish-language Netflix original programming
Television series based on actual events
Television series by Banijay
Television shows set in Stockholm
Television shows filmed in Sweden
Works about the music industry
Spotify